The Battle of Orléans took place in the year 463 pitting the forces of the Kingdom of Soissons, under the command of the magister militum Aegidius, against those of the Visigoths who were commanded by the Visigoth King Theodoric II and his brother Federico.

Context 
Aegidius, who had proclaimed the secession of the northern part of Gaul in 461 after the assassination of Emperor Majorian by Ricimer, a magister militum of Germanic origin who wanted greater control over the Western Empire. Ricimer installed what he hoped would be a more easily controllable emperor, Flavius Libius Severus Serpentius, a move that backfired as he was not recognized by a few of the provinces or by the eastern half of the empire.

The battle
Aegidius, having been stripped of his title by Ricimer, threatened to attack the Italian Peninsula with his considerable army. The Visigoths, sensing an opportunity to extend the frontier of their northern kingdom past the Loire River which was the contemporary boundary of their empire, and having been encouraged by Ricimer to attack the Alans, then allied to the Romans, to deflect their attention away from Italy, mobilized their army for an attack. The two armies met at Orléans in 463. The conflict ended in a costly defeat and rout of the Visigothic army and the death of their commander, Federico, the brother of Theodoric II.

Aftermath 
This defeat halted for some time the ambitions of the Visigoths with respect to this northern region of Gaul.  This was fortunate for Aegidius and the Roman rump state as they were also being constantly harassed by the Saxons under Odoacer. This Visigoth timidity ended with the Roman provocation at Battle of Déols where a Romano-British invasion army under Riothamus was defeated by the Visigoths from 470-71.

In historical literature 
The existence of this battle is referred to in various texts throughout the ages:

 Hydatius: Adversus Aegidium comitem utriusque militiae, virum, ut fama commendat, Deo bonis operibus complacentem, in Armoricana provincia Fretiricus frater Theuderici regis insurgens, cum his cum quibus fuerat, superatus occiditur. (Chronicle, 218). Of note, Hydatius places this battle in the year 461, missing from his account any data for the years ranging from 462 to 464.
 The Chronica Gallica of 511: In the fifth year of the reign of  Leo I the Thracian [which took place around 461-462] Fredericus frater Theuderici regis pugnans cum Francis occiditur iuxta Ligerim.
 Marius Aventicensis: [During the councilship of Basil and Vibiano of 463] His consulibus pugna facta est inter Aegidium et Gothos inter Ligerum et Ligericinum iuxta Aurelianis ibique interfectus est Fredericus rex Gothorum.
 Also, Gregory of Tours (II, 18) refers to the fighting in which the king of the Salian Franks, Childeric I had participated in during those years. Most modern historians have come to the conclusion that Aegidius had Frankish troops in his service and that Childeric was either a Roman ally or client during this time. That being stated, there is no concrete proof to affirm that there Childeric had been present, nor of the alliance between the two groups.

See also 
 List of Roman battles
 Decline of the Western Roman Empire
 Western Roman Empire

References

External links

460s conflicts
Battles involving the Visigoths
Battles involving the Franks
Battles involving the Roman Empire
Orleans 463
Theodosian dynasty
5th century in sub-Roman Gaul
463
460s in the Roman Empire
History of Orléans